The Qolastā, Qulasta, or Qolusta is the canonical prayer book of the Mandaeans, a Gnostic ethnoreligious group from Iraq and Iran. The Mandaic word qolastā means "collection". The prayerbook is a collection of Mandaic prayers regarding baptisms (masbuta) and other sacred rituals involved in the ascension of the soul (masiqta).

Date
The Qolasta, and two other key texts to Mandaic literature, the Mandaean Book of John and the Ginza Rabba, were compiled together. However, their date of authorship is heavily debated, some believing it to be during the second and third centuries, and others believing it to be conceived during the first century.

In 1949, Torgny Säve-Söderbergh demonstrated that many passages in the Manichaean Psalms of Thomas were paraphrases or even word-by-word translations of Mandaean prayers in the Qolasta. Säve-Söderbergh also argued that the Manichaean psalms had borrowed from Mandaean sources rather than vice versa. As a result, much of the Qolasta can be dated to before 3rd century, i.e. before Mani's lifetime.

Translations and manuscripts
It has been translated into English by E. S. Drower in 1959 and by Mark Lidzbarski into German in 1920. Lidzbarski's translation was based on two manuscripts, including Ms. Syr. F. 2 (R) held at the Bodleian Library, which he called "Roll F."

E. S. Drower's version of the Qolasta contains 414 prayers (338 prayers if excluding duplicated prayers), which was based on manuscript 53 of the Drower Collection (abbreviated DC 53). The fragmentary DC 3, which is an incomplete codex of the Qolasta, was also consulted by Drower. DC 53 was copied in 1802 by the ganzibra Adam Yuhana, the father of Yahia Bihram, in Huwaiza, Khuzistan. The manuscript was purchased by Drower in 1954.

Carlos Gelbert has also translated the 103 prayers from Lidzbarki's Mandäische Liturgien into Arabic. A typesetted Mandaic version has also been published in 1998 by Majid Fandi Al-Mubaraki.

Summary of contents

Mandäische Liturgien (Lidzbarski 1920)
Part 1 of Mark Lidzbarski's Liturgien (1920) (commonly abbreviated ML in Mandaic studies), titled the Qolastā, has only 103 prayers. Part 2 includes 4 books from the "Oxford Collection," with 60, 33, 20, and 20 prayers respectively for books 1-4. All of the prayers have the original Mandaic transcribed in Hebrew letters side-by-side with their respective German translations.

Mandäische Liturgien (1920) contents
Part 1: Qolastā
Book 1 (prayers 1-31): Masbuta liturgy
Book 2 (prayers 32-74): Masiqta liturgy
Book 3 (prayers 75-77): 3 prayers for masbuta and masiqta
Book 4 (prayers 78-103): Songs and hymns for masbuta and masiqta
Part 2: Oxford Collection
Book 1: 60 rahma devotional prayers, corresponding to CP 106-160, 165-169 in Drower (1959)
Book 2: 33 marriage (qabin) prayers. The first 20 prayers correspond to CP 180-199 in Drower (1959).
Book 3: 19 prayers
Book 4: 20 drabsha (banner) prayers, corresponding to CP 330-347 in Drower (1959) except for prayers 9 and 20

Lidzbarski's Mandäische Liturgien differs substantially from Drower's Canonical Prayerbook, since different manuscripts had been consulted.

Canonical Prayerbook (Drower 1959)
The 414 prayers in E. S. Drower's 1959 Canonical Prayerbook (commonly abbreviated CP in Mandaic studies) are categorized into the following sections:

There are 8 colophons in DC 53, which means that the manuscript had originally consisted of at least 8 separate texts. As a result, Buckley (2010) provides the following outline for Drower's Canonical Prayerbook (CP) based on the DC 53 colophons:

Part 1: CP 1–74, dates to the 3rd century
CP 1–31: The Book of Souls (also called The Book of Gadana), the baptismal liturgy
CP 32–72: the masiqta prayers
CP 73–74: the 2 "Letter" (‛ngirta) prayers
Part 2: CP 75–77: 3 long prayers of praise
Part 3: CP 78–103: the "responses" (‛nianas)
Part 4: CP 104–169
CP 104: a rušuma, i.e., "signing" prayer
CP 105: "The Healing of Kings"
CP 106–164: the rahmas, "devotions," prayed 3 times a day
CP 165–169: "The Fruits of Ether"
Part 5: CP 170–199
CP 170: Ṭabahatan, "Our Ancestors"
CP 171–178
CP 179: acrostic prayer
CP 180–199: prayers for priest initiation and for the marriage ceremony
Part 6: CP 200–284
CP 200–255
CP 205–256: priest initiation prayers
CP 257–284
Part 7: CP 285–304 (duplicates of other prayers)
Part 8: CP 305–329: priest initiation prayers
Remaining part (no colophon): CP 330–414

Frequently used prayers
One of the most important prayers is prayer 170, called the Ṭabahatan ("Our Ancestors"). As a commemoration prayer with a long list of names, the prayer starts with the line ṭab ṭaba lṭabia ("Good is the Good for the Good"). A different version of this prayer is found in DC 42, Šarḥ ḏ-Ṭabahata ("The Scroll of Ṭabahata" [Parents]), which is used during Parwanaya rituals.

In Mandaean rituals, many prayers are frequently recited in sets. Common sets of prayers listed in ritual texts such as the Scroll of Exalted Kingship, The Coronation of the Great Shishlam, the Alma Rišaia texts, and Zihrun Raza Kasia are given below. Drower's and Lidzbarki's numberings are equivalent for these prayers, since the first 103 prayers are nearly identical in both versions.
1, 3, 5, 19 (masbuta prayers for the turban and baptism wreath)
25-28 (sealing peayers, or haṭamta)
32-34 (masiqta prayers)
9, 35 (prayers of radiance) (sometimes swapped as 35, 9)
59-60 (masiqta prayers for the pihta and mambuha)
71-72 (masiqta prayers for the souls)
75-77 (long praise prayers)
91-99 (ʿniania: masiqta response hymns)
101-103 (ʿniania: masiqta response hymns)

The "loosening prayers" are known as širiata.

Recurring formulas
Many of the prayers in the Qolasta have recurring formulas such as:

The bšuma: "In the name of Hayyi Rabbi" (or sometimes more simply as  ), at the beginnings of prayers
"And Hayyi is victorious", at the ends of prayers
"And praise be to Hayyi", at the ends of prayers
"In the name of Hibil, Šitil, and Anuš"

List of prayers
The table below lists the 414 prayers in Drower's 1959 Canonical Prayerbook, along with their ritual uses. Many of the prayers are identical or nearly identical duplicates of other prayers in the prayerbook, as listed in the "corresponding prayer" column in the below. Opening lines, which exclude frequently used formulas such as "In the name of Hayyi Rabbi", are included since the original scribal commentaries in the Qolasta manuscripts, as well as external priestly esoteric commentaries (e.g., Scroll of Exalted Kingship), typically refer to each Qolasta prayer by its opening line rather than by an ordered number.

Drower (1959) also categorizes the prayers into different sections. Originally, some of these sections had historically been separate manuscripts before they had been compiled by Mandaean scribes into single codices (books) such as DC 53.

Each prayer is typically recited only for a specific stage of a certain ritual, as listed in the "commentary" column below. For example, see Tarmida#Prayer sequence for a detailed list of prayers recited during different stages of the tarmida initiation ceremony.

Corresponding prayers in Lidzbarski's Mandäische Liturgien (1920) are also provided.

Correspondences with the Ginza Rabba
Several of the prayers in Drower's Canonical Prayerbook of the Mandaeans (CP), mostly ʿniania ("responses") and masiqta prayers, correspond to hymns in Book 3 of the Left Ginza (GL 3):

Some marriage hymns (hadaiata) in the Canonical Prayerbook also correspond to some hymns in Book 12 of the Right Ginza (GR 12):

CP 179 = GR 12.2
CP 214 = GR 12.4

Use with other texts
Various esoteric texts used in priestly initiation ceremonies frequently refer to prayers in the Qolasta. These include:

The Thousand and Twelve Questions
Scroll of Exalted Kingship
The Coronation of the Great Shishlam
Alma Rišaia Rba
Alma Rišaia Zuṭa
Zihrun Raza Kasia
Scroll of the Ancestors
The Wedding of the Great Shishlam (for wedding ceremonies)

Many passages in these texts are essentially priestly commentaries on both the practical ritual applications and esoteric symbolism of specific prayers in the Qolasta.

See also

Asiet Malkia
Psalms
Gatha (Zoroaster)
Brakha

References

External links
Complete scan of Drower's translation of the Qolasta
Canonical Prayerbook (accidentally titled "Ginza Rabba" in the Gnosis Archive; incomplete and contains some typographical errors)
A slightly more complete version at the Internet Archive (the first few sections have not been archived)
Mandäische Liturgien by Mark Lidzbarski (1920) 

Mandaean Network texts in Mandaic
Qulasta (Mandaic text from the Mandaean Network)
Qulasta (Mandaic text from the Mandaean Network)
Sidra d-Nishmata, Book of the Soul (Mandaic text from the Mandaean Network)
Sidra d-Nishmata, Book of the Soul (Mandaic text from the Mandaean Network)
ʿNiani prayers (Mandaic text from the Mandaean Network)
ʿNiani prayers (Mandaic text from the Mandaean Network)
Diwan ʿNiani d-Masbuta (Mandaic text from the Mandaean Network)
Diwan ʿNiani d-Masbuta (Mandaic text from the Mandaean Network)

Audio recordings of Qolasta prayers
I rose up from the river (Qolasta 21) recited by Rbai Rafid al-Sabti in the Netherlands
Salutation of Kings (Asiet malkia) (Qolasta 105) recited by Rbai Rafid al-Sabti in the Netherlands
Salutation of Kings (Asiet malkia) (Qolasta 105) recited by Abdullah Khaffagi in Ahvaz in 1960
Salutation of Kings (Asiet malkia) (Qolasta 105) recited at a Parwanaya service in Michigan

1st-century texts
2nd-century texts
3rd-century texts
Mandaean texts
Prayer books
Hymns
Funerary texts